For Tennis in Italy, at this professional tournament, Daniele Bracciali and Alessandro Motti were the defending champions; however, they didn't play together this year.

Bracciali played alongside James Cerretani, while Motti partnered with Walter Trusendi. These two pairs lost to Andre Begemann and Martin Emmrich in the quarterfinals (Motti/Trusendi) and semifinals (Bracciali/Cerretani). This 4th-seeded German pair went on to win the tournament, by defeating Brian Battistone and Andreas Siljeström 1–6, 7–6(7–3), [10–7] in the final.

Seeds

Main draw

Draw

References
Main Draw

AON Open Challenger - Doubles
AON Open Challenger
AON